Running  is an album by the British hard rock band Trapeze. It was originally released only in Germany in 1978. A re-sequenced version with a different cover and title Hold On was later released in the U.K. and other countries in 1979 and in the U.S. market in 1980.

It is the only Trapeze studio album to feature vocalist Pete Goalby.

Track listing
 "Running"
 "Living On Love"
 "Don't Ask Me How I Know"
 "Take Good Care Of Me"
 "Time Will Heal"
 "Hold On"
 "Don't Break My Heart"
 "When You Get To Heaven"
 "You Are"

Personnel
Trapeze
 Mel Galley - guitars, vocals
 Dave Holland - drums, percussion
 Pete Goalby - lead vocals, guitar
 Pete Wright - bass
 Terry Rowley – keyboards, string arrangements

References

Trapeze (band) albums
1978 albums
Albums produced by Jimmy Miller